Mikołaj Sapieha may refer to several nobles from the Sapieha family:

Mikołaj Sapieha (died 1599) (before 1545 – 1599), voivode of Minsk, Brest Litovsk, Vitebsk

Mikołaj Sapieha (1581–1644), known as "Pious", voivode of Minsk, Brest Litovsk
Mikołaj Sapieha (1588–1638), voivode of Minsk, Nowogrodek
Mikołaj Krzysztof Sapieha (1613–1639), Field Notary of Lithuania
Mikołaj Leon Sapieha (1644–1685), voivode of Bratslav